The 1988 Melanesia Cup was the first Melanesia Cup football tournament held. It took place in Solomon Islands and four teams participated in the tournament: Fiji, Solomon Islands, New Caledonia and Vanuatu.

The teams played each other according to a round-robin format, and the top two teams (Fiji and Solomon Islands) played off in a final to determine the winner. New Caledonia and Vanuatu also played each other, on the same day as the final, to determine third place.

Fiji won the tournament with a 3–1 victory in the final, while Vanuatu retained third place by defeating New Caledonia 1–0.

First round

3rd/4th places

Final

References
RSSSF

Melanesia Cup
1988–89 in OFC football
1988
1988 in Solomon Islands sport
1988 in Oceanian sport
October 1988 sports events in Oceania